This is a list of the 5 members of the European Parliament for Malta in the 2004 to 2009 session.

List

Party representation

Notes

Malta
List
2004